Prodan is a South Slavic masculine given name.

Prodan may also refer to:
 Prodan (dye), a fluorescent dye used as a membrane probe